A beauty pageant is a competition that has traditionally focused on judging and ranking the physical attributes of the contestants. Pageants have now evolved to include inner beauty, with criteria covering judging of personality, intelligence, talent, character, and charitable involvement, through private interviews with judges and answers to public on-stage questions. The term beauty pageant refers originally to the Big Four international beauty pageants.

Pageant titles are subdivided into Miss, Mrs. or Ms., and Teen – to clearly identify the difference between pageant divisions. Hundreds and thousands of beauty contests are held annually, but the Big Four are considered the most prestigious, widely covered and broadcast by media. For example, The Wall Street Journal, BBC News, CNN, Xinhua News Agency, and global news agencies such as Reuters, Associated Press and Agence France-Presse collectively refer to the four major pageants as "Big Four" namely: Miss Universe, Miss World, Miss International, and Miss Earth.

The organizers of each pageant may determine the rules of the competition, including the age range of contestants. The rules may also require the contestants to be unmarried, and be "virtuous", "amateur", and available for promotions, besides other criteria. It may also set the clothing standards in which contestants will be judged, including the type of swimsuit.

Beauty pageants are generally multi-tiered, with local competitions feeding into the larger competitions. For example, the international pageants have hundreds or thousands of local competitions. Child beauty pageants mainly focus on beauty, gowns, sportswear modelling, talent, and personal interviews. Adult and teen pageants focus on makeup, hair and gowns, swimsuit modelling, and personal interviews.  A winner of a beauty contest is often called a beauty queen.  The rankings of the contestants are referred to as placements.

Possible awards of beauty contests include titles, tiaras, crowns, sashes, bouquets, scepters, savings bonds, scholarships, and prize money. Some pageants have awarded college scholarships to the winner or to multiple runners-up.

History

Early years

European festivals dating back to the medieval era provide the most direct lineage for beauty pageants. For example, English May Day celebrations always had the selection of a May Queen. In the United States, the May Day tradition of selecting a woman to serve as a symbol of beauty and community ideals continued, as young, beautiful women participated in public celebrations.

A beauty pageant was held during the Eglinton Tournament of 1839, organized by Archibald Montgomerie, 13th Earl of Eglinton, as part of a re-enactment of a medieval joust that was held in Scotland. The pageant was won by Georgiana Seymour, Duchess of Somerset, the wife of Edward Seymour, 12th Duke of Somerset, and sister of Caroline Norton, and she was proclaimed as the "Queen of Beauty".

Entrepreneur Phineas Taylor Barnum staged the first modern American pageant in 1854, but his beauty contest was closed down after public protest.

National pageants
Beauty contests became more popular in the 1880s. In 1888, the title of 'beauty queen' was awarded to an 18-year-old Creole contestant at a pageant in Spa, Belgium. All participants had to supply a photograph and a short description of themselves to be eligible to enter and a final selection of 21 was judged by a formal panel. Such events were not regarded as respectable. Beauty contests came to be considered more respectable with the first modern "Miss America" contest held in 1921.

The oldest pageant still in operation today is the Miss America pageant, which was organized in 1921 by a local businessman as a means to entice tourists to Atlantic City, New Jersey. The pageant hosted the winners of local newspaper beauty contests in the "Inter-City Beauty" Contest, which was attended by over one hundred thousand people. Sixteen-year-old Margaret Gorman of Washington, D.C., was crowned Miss America 1921, having won both the popularity and beauty contests, and was awarded $100.

International pageants 

In May 1920, promoter C.E. Barfield of Galveston, Texas organized a new event known as "Splash Day" on the island. The event featured a "Bathing Girl Revue" competition as the centerpiece of its attractions. The event was the kick-off of the summer tourist season in the city and was carried forward annually. The event quickly became known outside of Texas and, beginning in 1926, the world's first international contest was added, known as the International Pageant of Pulchritude. This contest is said to have served as a model for modern pageants. It featured contestants from England, Russia, Turkey, and many other nations and the title awarded at the time was known as "Miss Universe". The event was discontinued in the United States in 1932 because of the Depression (the international competition was revived briefly in Belgium).

After World War II
The popularity of the Miss America pageant prompted other organizations to establish similar contests in the 1950s and beyond. Some were significant while others were trivial, such as the National Donut Queen contest. The Miss World contest started in 1951, Miss Universe started in 1952 as did Miss USA. Miss International started in 1960. Miss Asia Pacific International which started in 1968 is the first and oldest beauty pageant in Asia. The Miss Black America contest started in 1968 in response to the exclusion of African American women from the Miss America pageant. The Miss Universe Organization started the Miss Teen USA in 1983 for the 14-19 age group. Miss Earth started in 2001, which channels the beauty pageant entertainment industry as an effective tool to actively promote the preservation of the environment. These contests continue to this day.

Swimsuit competition

The requirement for contestants to wear a swimsuit was a controversial aspect of the various competitions. The controversy was heightened with the increasing popularity of the bikini after its introduction in 1946. The bikini was banned for the Miss America contest in 1947 because of Roman Catholic protesters. When the Miss World contest started in 1951, there was an outcry when the winner was crowned in a bikini. Pope Pius XII condemned the crowning as sinful, and countries with religious traditions threatened to withdraw delegates. The bikini was banned for future and other contests. It was not until the late 1990s that they became permitted again, but still generated controversy when finals were held in countries where bikinis (or swimsuits in general) were socially disapproved. For example, in 2003, Vida Samadzai from Afghanistan caused an uproar in her native country when she participated in the Miss Earth 2003 contest in a red bikini. She was condemned by the Afghan Supreme Court, saying such a display of the female body goes against Islamic law and Afghan culture. In 2013, the swimsuit round of the Miss World contest was dropped because of Islamist protests in Bali (Indonesia), where the contest took place. In 2014, the Miss World contest eliminated the swimsuit competition from its pageant. In 2018, Miss America eliminated the swimsuit competition after 97 years.

In 2017, Carousel Productions was criticized for objectifying women during the Miss Earth 2017 competition where delegates wore swimsuits during the event with their faces concealed by a veil in the Beauty of Figure and Form, a segment first introduced in the Miss Philippines Earth 2017 pageant. It was one of the three preliminary judging segments of the pageant that include Poise and Beauty of Face and Environmental and Intelligence Competition. The organizers defended the "beauty of figure and form" segment and released a statement that the said round was intended to promote strict impartiality during pre-judging by focusing on the contestants' curves, execution and not beautiful face.

Major beauty pageants

The term "beauty pageant" refers largely to contests for women. Major international contests for women include the yearly Miss World competition (founded by Eric Morley in 1951), Miss Universe (founded in 1952), Miss International (founded in 1960), and Miss Earth (founded in 2001 with environmental awareness as its concern). These are considered the Big 4 pageants, the four largest and most famous international beauty contests for single or unmarried women.

Big Four international beauty pageants

Big Four dethronements and resignations
Dethronements and resignations are rare for the Big Four pageant winners, but when it does, it creates media attention.
 
The Miss World pageant has experienced 3 cases of dethronement or resignation instances:
 In 1973, Marjorie Wallace from the United States, who was crowned Miss World and once stated that "as Miss World I can get laid with any man I pick", dated a string of celebrities including George Best. She was dethroned three months after she was crowned.
 After being crowned Miss Wales and then Miss United Kingdom, Helen Morgan, competed and won Miss World 1974. However she was discovered to be a mother and was named in a divorce case. This led to her resigning four days after she was crowned. She was replaced by first runner-up of South Africa, Anneline Kriel.
 Gabriela Brum of Germany had the shortest reign in Miss World history when she resigned her title 18 hours after being crowned Miss World 1980. She indicated that her boyfriend disapproved of the contest, but it was later revealed that she had posed for naked photographs; she later relocated to the United States and modelled nude for Playboy. Second place Kimberley Santos of Guam replaced Brum by default.

In Miss Universe, Oxana Fedorova of Russia was crowned Miss Universe 2002 and was dethroned four months later as she was unable to fulfill her obligations. She was the first to be dethroned in the history of Miss Universe. She was replaced by first runner-up Justine Pasek of Panama. In its early years, there were two instances where the reigning Miss Universe opted to resign from her position: Armi Kuusela, Miss Universe 1952 from Finland, who held the distinction of being the first Miss Universe winner gave up her crown in less than a year to marry Filipino businessman Virgilio Hilario while Amparo Muñoz, Miss Universe 1974 of Spain refused to travel to Japan and instead resigned after six months of her reign. However, since the pageant had no concrete rule on resignation at that time, they were allowed to keep their titles.

In Miss Earth, the 2002 winner, Dzejla Glavovic of Bosnia and Herzegovina was dethroned of her crown six months into her reign, after she failed to show up at several environmental events. According to Carousel Productions, organizer of the Miss Earth contest, Glavovic was dethroned because of "her inability to fulfill the duties and responsibilities as the Miss Earth titleholder, in accordance with the rules and regulations set forth in the Miss Earth contract that she signed." She was succeeded by first runner-up Winfred Omwakwe of Kenya as Miss Earth 2002.

In Miss International, Ikumi Yoshimatsu, Miss International 2012 was the first titleholder of the pageant from Japan to be dethroned shortly before the end of her reign. She was ordered by the International Culture Association (Miss International organizer) to skip the succession ceremony and "play sick and shut up" out of fear of scandal. The Miss International organizer cited the reason for her dethronement was due to her involvement in a contract dispute with a talent agency in which she claimed that she was pressured to sign by Burning Productions, a film production company which is rumored to be linked with the Japanese underworld, but she refused and went ahead by starting her own company. Yoshimatsu filed criminal charges against one of Japan's most powerful talent agency executives, Genichi Taniguchi of Burning Productions, for allegedly stalking, intimidating, and harassing her.

Diversity 
Besides the international beauty pageants, numerous minor competitions exist throughout the world displaying the different perceptions of beauty. Some examples of criteria to select beauty queens that are unique to certain culture. The Miss India USA pageant uses Indian history and traditional craft skills as its specialties, while the Miss Howard University competition takes advantage of the principles of "black beauty". The winner is often viewed as a model for the "ideal" community member. Through the competitions, the contestants can learn how to present themselves in public and how to cultivate certain traits such as confidence or poise. In some cases, the competitors are selected to act as a representative on behalf of the community. In the African American community of Howard University, the selected Miss Howard University served as advocates for the Civil Rights Movement in the decades following the 1960s. Additionally, the Miss Landmine competition situated in Angola allow victims to serve as advocates on behalf of other victims of mining accidents.

Researchers suggest that the emergence of beauty pageants in countries outside the United States is linked to an economic boom geared towards a more consumeristic lifestyle. For example, in India, from 1996 to 2000, the personal care industry grew by 25% while the number of women applying for the Miss India competition increased from 1000 people in 1993 to 6500 people in 2001. Additionally, after China hosted about 6 international beauty pageants in 2004, the beauty industry increased in influence in the area. At the same time, the number of regional beauty pageants in the country increased.

Diversity of contestants and winners have both increased since the inception of beauty pageants. In 1983, Vanessa Williams, an American singer, actress and fashion designer gained recognition as being the first African American woman to receive the Miss America title. In 1945, Bess Myerson, an American politician, model and, television actress became the first Jewish person to win the Miss America title in the Atlantic city and to this day remains the only Jewish person to have received the crown. Her success in winning the title was hugely symbolic and personal to Jewish people at that time because it was during the midst of Nazi Germany's rise. In 1991, Lupita Jones, a Mexican actress and television producer, became the first Mexican person to win Miss Universe.

Criticism 

Critics of beauty pageants argue that such contests reinforce the idea that girls and women should be valued primarily for their physical appearance, and that this puts tremendous pressure on women to conform to conventional beauty standards by spending time and money on fashion, cosmetics, hair styling, and even cosmetic surgery. They say that this pursuit of physical beauty even encourages some women to diet to the point of harming themselves.

The London Feminist Network argues that rather than being empowering, beauty pageants do the opposite: denying women's full humanity by subjecting them to objectification, denying their full humanity by maintaining that their primary purpose is to be attractive.

Another criticism is in the way beauty pageant is quantifiably scored as highlighted by the "Myth of the Perfect 10". Beauty becomes a numerical coefficient in ranking contestants, and this type of scoring still remains followed as a system even in nationwide beauty pageants such as Miss America.

Researchers suggest that these events strengthen skills, such as interpersonal communications, self-assurance, and public speaking, which prove to be useful in future career paths.

Some critics claim that even after beauty pageants became diverse by the end of the 20th century, there is still this misconception that the ideal image of traditional beauty is a white woman.

Scandals 
There have been numerous scandals in the beauty pageant industry and they continue to emerge as beauty pageants are becoming more known to the public. For instance, in December 2017, HuffPost published emails which were written by former Miss America CEO Sam Haskell. In these emails, the contestant speaks about other contestants and refers to them as "snakes". Due to these emails coming out to the public, the contestant resigned from her position.

Laura Zúñiga, former Miss Hispanic America was detained with her boyfriend and six other people for the crimes of racketeering, drug trafficking, weapons violation and money laundering. The group was caught by the police as they held many 9-mm handguns and roughly $53,000 in cash.

At the Miss Teen USA 2007 pageant, Caitlin Upton gained international notoriety for her convoluted and nonsensical response to a question posed to her during the August 2007 national pageant. During the pageant, host Aimee Teegarden asked: "Recent polls have shown a fifth of Americans can't locate the U.S. on a world map. Why do you think this is?" Upton responded:
I personally believe that U.S. Americans are unable to do so because, uh, some, uh, people out there in our nation don't have maps and, uh, I believe that our education like such as in South Africa and, uh, the Iraq, everywhere like such as, and, I believe that they should, our education over here in the U.S. should help the U.S., uh, or, uh, should help South Africa and should help the Iraq and the Asian countries, so we will be able to build up our future. For our children.

As a guest on NBC's The Today Show, Upton told Ann Curry and Matt Lauer that she was overwhelmed when asked the question and did not comprehend it correctly.

See also

List of beauty pageants
List of beauty queen-politicians
Swimsuit competition
Child beauty pageant
Miss Captivity Pageant

References

Bibliography 
 Banet‐Weiser, Sarah. "The Most Beautiful Girl in the World: Beauty Pageants and National Identity". (Berkeley: University of California Press, 1999)
 Bell, Myrtle P., Mary E. McLaughlin, and Jennifer M. Sequeira. "Discrimination, Harassment, and the Glass Ceiling: Women Executives as Change Agents". Journal of Business Ethics. 37.1 (2002): 65–76. Print.
 Burgess, Zena, and Phyllis Tharenou. "Women Board Directors: Characteristics of the Few". Journal of Business Ethics. 37.1 (2002): 39–49. Print.
 Ciborra, Claudio U. "The Platform Organization: Recombining Strategies, Structures, and Surprises". Organization Science. 7.2 (1996): 103–118. Print.
 Harvey, Adia M. "Becoming Entrepreneurs: Intersections of Race, Class, and Gender at the Black Beauty Salon". Gender and Society. 19.6 (2005): 789–808. Print.
 Huffman, Matt L., and Philip N. Cohen. "Occupational Segregation and the Gender Gap in Workplace Authority: National versus Local Labor Markets". Sociological Forum. 19.1 (2004): 121–147. Print.
 Lamsa, Anna-Maija, and Teppo Sintonen. "A Discursive Approach to Understanding Women Leaders in Working Life". Journal of Business Ethics. 34.3/4 (2001): 255–267. Print.
 Liben, Lynn S., Rebecca Bigler, Diane N Ruble, Carol Lynn Martin, and Kimberly K. Powlishta. "Conceptualizing, Measuring, and Evaluating Constructs and Pathways". Developmental Course of Gender Differentiation. 67.2 i-183. Print.
 Sones, Michael. "History of the Beauty Pageant". Beauty Worlds: The Culture of Beauty (2003): n. pag. Web. 4 November 2009.
 Wilk, Richard. "The Local and the Global in the Political Economy of Beauty: From Miss Belize to Miss World". Review of International Political Economy. 2.1 (1995): 117–134. Print.

 
Articles containing video clips